Staccione is an Italian surname. Notable people with the surname include:

Eugenio Staccione (1909–1967), Italian footballer, brother of Vittorio
Vittorio Staccione (1904–1945), Italian footballer

Italian-language surnames